The Last Witness is a 1960 West German crime film directed by Wolfgang Staudte and starring Martin Held, Hanns Lothar and Ellen Schwiers. It was entered into the 1961 Cannes Film Festival. It was shot at the Spandau Studios in Berlin. The film's sets were designed by the art director Hans Kuhnert.

Cast
 Martin Held as Direktor Werner Rameil
 Hanns Lothar as Lawyer Dr. Fox
 Ellen Schwiers as Ingrid Bernhardy
 Jürgen Goslar as Dr. Heinz Stephan
 Adelheid Seeck as Gerda Rameil
 Werner Hinz as Landgerichtsrat Ricker
 Lore Hartling as Assessorin Ebeling
 Siegfried Wischnewski as Kriminalinspektor Gerhuf
 Harald Juhnke as Kriminalsekretär Wenzel
 Otto Graf as Anwalt Dr. Beyer
 Albert Bessler as Dr. Hollberg
 Lucie Mannheim as Frau Bernhardy
 Hans Hessling as Vorsitzender des Schwurgerichts
 Hellmut Grube as Prosecutor Thalmann
 Rudi Schmitt as Amtsgerichtsrat Glänzer
 Herbert Tiede as Dr. Heinz Stephan's Lawyer
 Blandine Ebinger as  Gymnastiklehrerin

References

Bibliography
 Goble, Alan. The Complete Index to Literary Sources in Film. Walter de Gruyter, 1999.

External links

1960 films
1960 crime films
German crime films
West German films
1960s German-language films
German black-and-white films
Films directed by Wolfgang Staudte
German courtroom films
Films shot at Spandau Studios
1960s German films